Sete de Junho Esporte Clube, commonly known as Sete de Junho, is a Brazilian football club based in Tobias Barreto, Sergipe state.

History
The club was founded on June 23, 1981. They won the Campeonato Sergipano Série A2 in 2011, after beating Laranjeiras in the last round of the competition, thus finishing ahead of Lagarto in the league, thus gaining promotion to the 2012 First Level.

Achievements
 Campeonato Sergipano Série A2:
 Winners (2): 2008, 2011

Stadium
Sete de Junho Esporte Clube play their home games at Estádio Antônio Brejeiro, nicknamed Brejeirão. The stadium has a maximum capacity of 4,000 people.

References

Association football clubs established in 1983
Football clubs in Sergipe
1983 establishments in Brazil